Neem Annapurna (English language:Bitter Morsel) is a 1979 Bengali film directed by Buddhadev Dasgupta and starring Sunil Mukherjee. The movie is based on  Bengali short story, Neem Annapurna by Kamal Kumar Majumdar.It won the National film award for best cinematography.

External links
 

1979 films
Bengali-language Indian films
Films directed by Buddhadeb Dasgupta
Films set in Kolkata
Films whose cinematographer won the Best Cinematography National Film Award
1970s Bengali-language films